The siege of Valenciennes took place from 28 February to 17 March 1677, during the Franco-Dutch War, when Valenciennes, then in the Spanish Netherlands, was attacked by a French army under the duc de Luxembourg. 

Over the winter of 1676 to 1677, Valenciennes and Cambrai were subjected to a tight blockade, which prevented reinforcements or supplies reaching them from the outside. French armies also benefitted from superior logistics, which allowed them to begin campaigns far earlier than their opponents. Siege operations began on 28 February, supervised by French military engineer Sébastien Le Prestre de Vauban, and the town surrendered on 17 March; Spain formally ceded it to France under the August 1678 Treaty of Nijmegen.

Background
In the 1667–1668 War of Devolution, France captured most of the Spanish Netherlands, and the Spanish province of Franche-Comté. Louis XIV relinquished most of these gains in the Treaty of Aix-la-Chapelle, under pressure from the Triple Alliance of the Dutch Republic, England and Sweden. To split the Alliance, Louis paid Sweden to remain neutral, while signing an alliance with England against the Dutch in the 1670 Treaty of Dover.

The Franco-Dutch War began in May 1672 when France invaded the Dutch Republic; they initially seemed to have won an overwhelming victory, but the Dutch position stabilised. Concern at French gains brought them support from Frederick William of Brandenburg-Prussia, Emperor Leopold and Charles II of Spain. France retained the Dutch stronghold of Maastricht, but withdrew from the Netherlands in 1673, additional fronts opening in the Rhineland and the Spanish Pyrenees.

The French position weakened in early 1674, when Denmark-Norway joined the Alliance in January, followed by the February Treaty of Westminster making peace between England and the Dutch Republic. Despite this, by the end of 1674, France had re-captured Franche-Comté, and made significant gains in Alsace; the focus now changed to consolidation. An effective Allied response in Flanders was hampered by power struggles in Madrid, whose control over the Spanish Netherlands was by now largely nominal.

Peace talks had begun at Nijmegen in 1676 but Louis' policy was to take the offensive before agreeing terms and negotiate from strength; the French quickly captured Condé-sur-l'Escaut, Bouchain, Maubeuge and Bavay. The capture of Condé and Bouchain allowed them to blockade Valenciennes and Cambrai; their cavalry fought skirmishes with the Spanish garrisons and devastated the villages around the towns. Marshal Schomberg, commander of the French field army in Flanders, proposed taking Cambrai in August but was ordered to relieve Maastricht, then under siege by the Dutch.

The plan for 1677 was to take Valenciennes, Cambrai and Saint-Omer; this would complete the French frontière de fer or 'iron border,' which Louis calculated would leave the Dutch little reason to continue. To confuse his opponents, the French king travelled to Metz on 7 February, where he inspected the Army of the Moselle, now commanded by Schomberg. Over the winter, Marquis de Louvois assembled supply depots along the border with the Spanish Netherlands, allowing the campaign to open in February, a month earlier than usual. In late February, a detachment of 12,000 men besieged Saint Omer, while the main army of 35,000 men under duc de Luxembourg surrounded Valenciennes, where they were joined by Louis.

Battle

Valenciennes was positioned on the Rhonelle, a tributary of the Scheldt (French), a major trade route giving access to the sea at Antwerp. Until the advent of railways in the 19th century, goods and supplies were largely transported by water and campaigns often focused on gaining access to these.

The Spanish governor was Henri de Melun, Marquis de Richebourg, an experienced soldier and brother of the Prince d'Epinoy, senior members of the French-speaking nobility in the Spanish Netherlands. He had around 1,150 regular troops, plus two to three thousand civilian auxiliaries and adequate supplies of food and arms. 

His position was hopeless without relief, while the early start provided the French by Louvois meant the Dutch were still assembling troops and supplies. Since it was accepted the best defended town could not be held indefinitely, Richebourg's objective was to occupy the attacking force as long as possible.

The French military engineer, Sébastien Le Prestre de Vauban directed operations, using the siege parallel for the first time since it was pioneered at Maastricht in 1673; the bombardment began on 1 March, but siege works were delayed by heavy rain. For propaganda purposes, Louis often appeared at major sieges and joined Luxembourg at Valenciennes, along with other subordinate commanders including his brother, Philippe of Orléans, d'Humières and La Feuillade. 

Work on the trenches finally began on 8 March, preparing for an assault on the Porte d'Anzin, the strongest part of the defences but where the ground was driest. By 16 March, Vauban felt they were close enough to launch an attack, and proposed they do so by day. Normal practice was to do so at night, but he argued it would also surprise the defenders, while allowing better co-ordination among the attacking force. 

His plan was approved, and the French artillery kept up a continuous bombardment during the night of 16th/17th, while an assault force of 4,000 moved into the trenches, including the elite Musketeers of the Guard. At 9:00 a.m. on 17 March, the attackers formed two columns and stormed the walls; they achieved complete surprise and quickly over-ran the defenders, capturing a bridge over the Rhonelle that controlled access to the main city. Both sides wanted to minimise the damage that would follow an assault, since Louis intended to annex it to France, while the conventions of siege warfare shielded a town from being sacked if the defenders yielded once 'a practicable breach' had been made. Richebourg promptly surrendered, and Luxembourg withdrew the attacking troops after the city council agreed to pay a ransom.

Aftermath

After Valenciennes surrendered on 17 March, the main army moved onto Cambrai. An attempt by William of Orange to relieve Saint-Omer was defeated at Cassel on 11 April and Cambrai surrendered on 17 April, followed by Saint-Omer on 20 April.

Superior logistics allowed the French to make gains early in the campaigning season, before the Allies could mobilise, then consolidate. The capture of Valenciennes and Cambrai largely completed their 1677 objectives in Flanders. The peace talks at Nijmegen were given a greater sense of urgency in November after William's marriage to his cousin Mary, niece of Charles II of England. An Anglo-Dutch defensive alliance followed in March 1678, although English troops did not arrive in significant numbers until late May; Louis used this opportunity to capture Ypres and Ghent in early March, before signing a peace treaty with the Dutch on 10 August.

The war with the Dutch officially ended on 10 August 1678 with the signing of the Treaties of Nijmegen, although a combined Dutch-Spanish army attacked the French at Saint-Denis on 13 August. The agreement ensured Spain retained Mons and on 19 September, they signed their own treaty with France, ceding Saint-Omer, Cassel, Aire, Ypres, Cambrai, Valenciennes and Maubeuge. With the exception of Ypres, returned to Spain in 1697, this fixed France's northern frontier close to where it remains today but the Treaties of Nijmegen proved the highpoint of French expansion under Louis XIV.

References

Sources
 
 
 
 
 
 
 
 
 
 
 
 

Conflicts in 1677
Valenciennes
Valenciennes
Valenciennes
1676 in the Habsburg Netherlands
1677 in the Habsburg Netherlands
Franco-Dutch War